Grandmaster is a 1972 Soviet sports drama film directed by Sergey Mikaelyan.

Plot 
The film tells about the emotional chess player Sergey Khlebnikov, who does not play for the sake of victory. And suddenly he becomes the winner of the international match of applicants.

Cast 
 Andrey Myagkov as  Sergey Khlebnikov
 Viktor Korchnoi as Khlebnikov's coach
 Larisa Malevannaya	as Elena Dontsova, Khlebnikov's wife
 Emmanuil Vitorgan		as Orlov
 Lyudmila Kasatkina	as Sergey's mother
 Mikhail Kozakov 	as 	Vladimir
 Yefim Kopelyan as Pavel Maksimovich
 Nikolay Volkov Sr. as old man from chess pavilion
 Tamara Sovchi as Anya
 Anatoliy Solonitsyn as Sergey's father
 Vladimir Tatosov as Sergey Aleksandrovich
Petr Shelokhonov as Fyodor Matveyevich
 Mikhail Tal, Tigran Petrosian, Yuri Averbakh, Mark Taimanov,  Paul Keres, Alexander Kotov, Mikael Tariverdiev as cameo

References

External links 
 

1972 films
1970s Russian-language films
1970s sports drama films
1972 drama films
Films about chess
Lenfilm films
Films directed by Sergei Mikaelyan
Soviet sports drama films
1972 in chess